The Benelli Volcano is a two-speed two-stroke 180 cc minibike made in Italy during the early 1970s. Only 200 were ever imported to the USA. They can also be found in Italy. All 200 of the Volcanos in the USA were imported by Cosmopolitan Motors.

See also 
List of Benelli motorcycles

References

Volcano
Minibikes
Motor scooters